Keeper's Travels in Search of His Master is a children's novel written in 1798 by Edward Augustus Kendall, and reprinted throughout the nineteenth century.  This work of popular romanticism is crucially important in marking the great change in the representation of animals in literature, from the fabulous, the allegorical and the satirical to the naturalistic and the empathetic.  By employing new narrative techniques for representing thought in fiction, Kendall pioneered writers' attempts to imagine and describe the experiences of animals. In Keeper's Travels, the main character, Keeper, is given a speaking voice.

Plot
The story is of a dog who becomes lost and injured, and recounts the many people whom he came across in his journey home, some who took him in and nursed him, others who took their boot to him.

External links
Keeper's Travels: online text

1798 novels
1790s children's books
British children's novels
Children's novels about animals
18th-century British children's literature
Novels about dogs